The Jingjinji Champions Cup is a Chinese regional association football competition held since 2016. The tournament is originated by three clubs from Jingjinji area including Beijing Guoan (Jing), Tianjin Teda (Jin) and Hebei China Fortune (Ji), and hosted by the three clubs alternately. Henan Jianye was invited to the first edition of the tournament.

Tournaments

Awards

Most valuable players

Top scorers

References

 
Football cup competitions in China